Ellougik Essiyasi or The political logic (Tunisian arabic : اللوجيك السياسي) is a Tunisian satirical latex puppet show broadcast on Ettounisya TV. It's inspired by the French show Les guignols de l'info, which in turn is derived from the British satirical puppet show Spitting Image, and presented by Taoufik Labidi

History 
Under the regime of Zine el Abidine Ben Ali, the show is broadcast under another name Qaddachna Lougik ! (How logical as we are !), during the month of Ramadan and did not talk about politics but about culture, sport and society. After the Tunisian revolution and the departure of Ben Ali, it was renamed. His first broadcast was on May 9, 2011 with puppets of Ben Ali, Béji Caïd Essebsi and Nabil Karoui. Following the success of this single episode, it turned into a regular program, inserted in the emission of Moez Ben Ghabia inspired by Grand Journal, Ettesia Massaa ( 21 Hours ), from March 1, 2012. It is broadcast every Thursday until June 19, 2012. It is then broadcast every night during the second half of Ramadan 2012.

Puppets 
Here is the list of characters with a puppet:
 Taoufik Labidi
 Wassim Migalou
 Zine el Abidine Ben Ali
 Rashid al-Ghannushi
 Hamadi Jebali
 Moncef Marzouki
 Béji Caïd Essebsi
 Ibrahim Kassas
 Nabil Karoui
 Ahmed Ibrahim
 Ahmed Najib Chebbi
 Ala Chebbi
 Hamma Hammami
 Ahmed Mghirbi
 Faouzi Benzarti

Notes 

Television in Tunisia
Satirical television shows
Television shows featuring puppetry
Political satirical television series